KXMA-TV (channel 2) is a television station in Dickinson, North Dakota, United States, airing programming from The CW Plus and CBS. The station is owned and operated by The CW's majority owner, Nexstar Media Group, and maintains a news bureau and advertising sales office at the intersection of West Villard Street and State Avenue North in Dickinson; its transmitter is located southwest of the city. As Dickinson is located in the Mountain Time Zone, the station's prime time schedule starts at 6 p.m. rather than the usual 7 p.m. start for the rest of Mountain Time, or in Central Time, where most of North Dakota is located.

KXMA's second digital subchannel is considered a semi-satellite of KXMB-TV in Bismarck, which is the flagship station of the four-station KX Television regional network. KXMC-TV in Minot is the oldest station and former flagship of the KX group, while KXMB provides master control and some internal operations for the entire network. KXMA-DT2 airs a time-shifted simulcast of KXMB in Mountain Time for most of the day, clearing all network and syndicated programming as provided through its parent. However, KXMA-DT2 airs separate legal identifications and commercial inserts. The KX network relays CBS network programming and other programs across central and western North Dakota, as well as bordering counties in Montana and South Dakota. KXMA serves the southwestern portion of the Bismarck–Minot market. The four stations are counted as a single unit for ratings purposes. Unlike the other KX stations, KXMA airs The CW Plus on its main signal as a satellite of KXMB-DT2—hence its on-air branding, Dakota's CW 2—and CBS programming (which aired on 2.1 until 2016) on DT2.

History

KXMA signed on in 1956 as KDIX-TV, and was owned by the Dickinson Radio and TV Corporation along with KDIX radio. Although the Federal Communications Commission (FCC) had combined all of western and central North Dakota into a single market in the mid-1950s, this wouldn't be fully realized for another three decades, mainly because Dickinson is in the Mountain Time Zone. It carried programming from all three networks—CBS, NBC and ABC—but was a primary CBS affiliate.

The station was unable to get a direct network feed for its first three decades on the air. Until 1966, the station picked up what CBS programs it could under CBS' Extended Market Plan, which served as a go-between for non-interconnected stations in very small markets. It also aired a few ABC and NBC shows out of pattern.

Then, in 1966, KOTA-TV in Rapid City planned to sign on KHSD-TV (channel 11), a satellite station in Lead, South Dakota; to extend its coverage into northeastern Wyoming and southeastern Montana. At the time, KOTA-TV held a joint affiliation with CBS and ABC, but slightly favored CBS. Stanley Deck, KDIX's general manager at the time, discovered that Dickinson was close enough to Lead that his engineers could easily get an acceptable signal from KHSD whenever CBS and ABC programming aired. He arranged with the Duhamel family, owners of KOTA, to provide network programming for KDIX-TV. In addition, Deck purchased virtually all the stock in the Dickinson Radio and TV Corporation. The deal took effect when KHSD opened on November 2, 1966; for the next several years, KDIX was practically a separately-owned satellite of KOTA. It continued airing NBC programming even after KFYR-TV opened a low-powered translator in Dickinson around 1967.

Then, in 1970, KOTA swapped affiliations with KRSD-TV (a precursor of the present KOTA-TV) and joined NBC. KDIX-TV still picked up ABC programming from KOTA, and was also able to pick up NBC as well. However, its engineers now had to switch to KXMB's signal for CBS shows. A decade later, in 1980, KFYR-TV owner Meyer Television upgraded its Dickinson translator to a full-power station, KQCD-TV. Channel 2 then dropped all NBC programming and severed its remaining ties with KOTA-TV; afterward, KDIX-TV and the Reiten stations — KXMC-TV, KXMB-TV, and KXMD-TV — were jointly branded as the "4X Network."

In 1983, Deck sold KDIX-TV to Big Horn Communications, which owned KOUS-TV (now KHMT) in Billings, and the calls were changed to KNDX. Big Horn paid so little attention to KNDX that the station's signal quickly deteriorated to the point of unacceptability. With the station on the verge of closing down, the Reitens came to KNDX's rescue, agreeing to buy the station in late 1984. The station adopted its current calls, KXMA-TV, when the deal closed on January 2, 1985. (It would have been KXME, but Prairie Public Television objected.)  With wealthier ownership, KXMA was finally able to get a direct network feed from CBS. Since then, KXMA has been a semi-satellite of KXMB, airing a time-shifted feed of KXMB in Mountain Time. It continued to air a few ABC shows until 1986, when newly signed-on Bismarck ABC affiliate KBMY opened a translator in Dickinson.

In 2006, the stations began a web portal-like website called KX Net, with each station's website displaying a localized front page. The stations continue to be branded as "KX Television" and as "KX News" on the air, but also began using the "KX Net" moniker on the air also. KXNet.com combined the previous domains kxma.com, kxmb.com, kxmc.com and kxmd.com under one umbrella. The original domains are still active. KXNet.com won the 2007 Teddy Award for Best Website and the 2007 Eric Sevareid Award for best website small market television in a six state region.

In July 2008, Reiten Television began a joint agreement to sell television commercial slots on both its existing stations and KBMY, Bismarck's ABC affiliate owned by Forum Communications Company. A consequence of this agreement was that KBMY's programming began to be simulcast in Dickinson on a full-power signal on KXMA's second digital subchannel in 2009.

In October 2007, KXNet.com along with Midkota Solutions launched DakotaPolitics.com, a web site focusing on North Dakota political news coverage.  DakotaPolitics featured profile information, voting records and some analysis. DakotaPolitics also launched weekly tracking polls for the 2008 elections. In 2008, KXNet.com became the first web site in North Dakota to deliver a live news broadcast over the Internet when they streamed a 1-hour special coverage of the 2008 Presidential Caucuses from Bismarck.

Nexstar Broadcasting Group announced its $44 million purchase of the Reiten Television stations, including KXMA-TV, on September 17, 2015. Sale was completed on February 2, 2016. As result of the acquisition, Nexstar decided to terminate the Joint Sales Agreement with KBMY.

Programming
The KX network carries the CBS Overnight News (though with public service announcements instead of local commercials), while weekends simulcast the local weather conditions of North Dakota. All four stations provide a formal sign-off, including "The Star-Spangled Banner", at 1:05 a.m. CT/12:05 a.m. MT Tuesday through Saturday mornings and at 1:35 a.m. CT/12:35 a.m. MT on Sunday and Monday mornings.

The North Dakota State Fair parade in Minot is aired live across the KX network every July as well as a July 4th Parade in Mandan.

News operation
KXMB produces local newscasts on weekdays at noon, 6 and 10 p.m. Weekend newscasts are produced at 6 and 10 p.m. on Saturdays, and 10 p.m. on Sundays. KXMC produces a morning show at 5 a.m. and co-produces a 5 p.m. newscast with KXMB, broadcast on all four stations. All of the local newscasts are broadcast in high definition.

For many years, KXMA placed inserts into KXMB's newscasts. However, recent cutbacks have resulted in KXMA's operations being largely merged with those of KXMB, and local inserts have been eliminated.

As a whole, KX Television has long trailed NBC North Dakota in the ratings by a significant margin; the main stations and their satellites are counted as one station for ratings and regulatory purposes. However, KX News Morning has recently surged well ahead of NBC North Dakota's Country Morning Today—the only time in recent memory that NBC North Dakota has lost consecutive ratings periods in any time slot.

On November 30, 2013, actor Will Ferrell, as a promotion for his film Anchorman 2, co-anchored the KX network's evening news as his character Ron Burgundy.

Technical information

Subchannels
The station's digital signal is multiplexed:

Starting in 2016, KXMA moved CBS programming to its second digital subchannel, with The CW on its primary channel. This is likely to ensure satellite carriage for The CW in the market.

Analog-to-digital conversion
KXMA-TV shut down its analog signal, over VHF channel 2, on June 12, 2009, the official date in which full-power television stations in the United States transitioned from analog to digital broadcasts under federal mandate. The station's digital signal remained on its pre-transition UHF channel 19. Through the use of PSIP, digital television receivers display the stations virtual channel as its former VHF analog channel 2.

See also
KXMB-TV
KXMC-TV
KXMD-TV

References

External links

CBS network affiliates
Laff (TV network) affiliates
Ion Mystery affiliates
Television channels and stations established in 1956
XMA-TV
The CW affiliates
Dickinson, North Dakota
Nexstar Media Group